Aleksi Rinne (6 June 1899 in Teuva – 25 September 1974) was a Finnish smallholder and politician. He was a member of the Parliament of Finland from 1945 to 1948, representing the Finnish People's Democratic League (SKDL).

References

1899 births
1974 deaths
People from Teuva
People from Vaasa Province (Grand Duchy of Finland)
Finnish People's Democratic League politicians
Members of the Parliament of Finland (1945–48)
Finnish people of World War II